Syed Hashim Raza was a leading bureaucrat and former Governor of East Pakistan.

Early life and education
He was born on 16 February 1910 at Unnao in United Provinces of Agra and Oudh, British India into a prominent Family of Mashhadi Persian Origin.

In 1932, he graduated from Lucknow University with a Master of Arts degree in political science. Then he went on to University of Oxford, England for further studies.

Career
In 1934, he joined the Indian civil service in British India. From 1934 to 1939, he was an assistant collector and magistrate. He served as deputy commissioner in Larkana and Tharparkar districts from 1943 to 1946. From 1946 to 1947, he served as the deputy secretary of Home and General Departments. Syed Hashim Raza held numerous positions from provincial press adviser, secretary to the Governor of Sindh among others.

From 1948 to 1951, he was the first administrator of the then federal capital of Pakistan, Karachi. In fact, he was serving in this administrator's position when the founder of Pakistan Muhammad Ali Jinnah died on 11 September 1948 in Karachi. He was one of the close associates of Jinnah. From 1951 to 1953, he served in various capacities in the Sindh administration. From 1 July 1961 to 5 August 1961, he was the acting Governor of East Pakistan.

Awards and recognition
 Sitara-I-Pakistan (Star of Pakistan) Award for his distinguished services to Pakistan
 Sitara-e-Quaid-e-Azam (Star of Quaid-e-Azam) Award by the Government of Pakistan

Death and legacy
He died on 30 September 2003 in Karachi, Pakistan at age 92 due to kidney failure after a long illness. He was married to Salma Raza. He had two daughters and two sons, Syed Ali Raza, former president of National Bank of Pakistan, and Syed Salim Raza, former Governor of State Bank of Pakistan.

References

1910 births
2003 deaths
Governors of East Pakistan
Muhajir people
Pakistani civil servants
All India Muslim League members
Recipients of the Sitara-e-Pakistan